The 2019 World Qualification Event was held from January 18 to 23 at the Maniototo Curling International rink in Naseby, New Zealand. It was jointly hosted by Australia and New Zealand, with the New Zealand women's team taking one host berth and the Australia men's team the other.

South Korea and the Netherlands, the top two finishers in the men's division, qualified for the 2019 World Men's Curling Championship, while China and Finland qualified for the 2019 World Women's Curling Championship as the top two finishers in the women's division.

Men

Qualification
The following nations qualified to participate in the 2019 World Qualification Event:
 (host country)
One team from the 2018 Americas Challenge

Four teams from the 2018 European Curling Championships

Two teams from the 2018 Pacific-Asia Curling Championships

Notes
Crossed-out teams qualified for this event on merit, but later withdrew and were replaced.

Teams

Round-robin standings

Round-robin results
All draw times are listed in New Zealand Daylight Time (UTC+13:00).

Draw 2
Friday, January 18, 19:00

Draw 4
Saturday, January 19, 14:00

Draw 6
Sunday, January 20, 09:00

Draw 8
Sunday, January 20, 19:00

Draw 10
Monday, January 21, 14:00

Draw 12
Tuesday, January 22, 09:00

Draw 14
Tuesday, January 22, 19:00

Playoffs

1 vs. 2
Wednesday, January 23, 09:00

Winner qualifies for 2019 World Men's Curling Championship.

Loser advances to second place game.

Second place game
Wednesday, January 23, 14:00

Winner qualifies for 2019 World Men's Curling Championship.

Women

Qualification
The following nations qualified to participate in the 2019 World Qualification Event:
 (host country)
One team from the 2018 Americas Challenge

Four teams from the 2018 European Curling Championships

Two teams from the 2018 Pacific-Asia Curling Championships

Notes
Crossed-out teams qualified for this event on merit, but later withdrew and were replaced.

Teams

Round-robin standings

Round-robin results
All draw times are listed in New Zealand Daylight Time (UTC+13:00).

Draw 1
Friday, January 18, 15:00

Draw 3
Saturday, January 19, 09:00

Draw 5
Saturday, January 19, 19:00

Draw 7
Sunday, January 20, 14:00

Draw 9
Monday, January 21, 09:00

Draw 11
Monday, January 21, 19:00

Draw 13
Tuesday, January 22, 14:00

Playoffs

1 vs. 2
Wednesday, January 23, 09:00

Winner qualifies for 2019 World Women's Curling Championship.

Loser advances to second place game.

Second place game
Wednesday, January 23, 14:00

Winner qualifies for 2019 World Women's Curling Championship.

References

External links

World Qualification Event
International curling competitions hosted by New Zealand
International curling competitions hosted by Australia
Sport in Otago
World Qualification Event